Mohammad Aliff bin Aziz (born 16 February 1991) is a Singaporean singer and actor currently based in Malaysia. He is managed under Sony Music BMG Malaysia. In July 2007, he was crowned the winner of a reality TV singing competition, Anugerah, making him the youngest winner (won the title at the age of 16) of the show/competition. In September of that same year, Aziz releases his first self-titled album with single "Cinta Arjuna'" (Tong Hua cover) with 300,000 copies sold around Southeast Asia. His first single, "Sayang Sayang" receives the most number of ringtone downloads (1 million) across Southeast Asia. Song was inspired by Sham Faisal who was told to have a very strong influence on the singer.

Aliff currently had 4 albums: Aliff (2007), It's Aliff's Time (2010), Aliff Aziz (2012) and Rebirth (2016).

Early life
Born on 16 February 1991, Aliff was the eldest among three siblings. Aliff was born to a Malay family of mixed Arab heritage. At the age of three, Aliff and his family welcomed the birth of two twins, Nur Aisyah Binte Aziz and Nur A'in Binte Aziz. He and his twin sisters attended Princess Elizabeth Primary School before heading up to the next level where he and Aisyah attended Zhenghua Secondary School while A'in went to GreenRidge Secondary School respectively.

Career
Aliff was crowned the youngest Anugerah 2007 winner at age of 16. The 16 year old Zhenghua Secondary School student scored a recording deal with Sony BMG and Mediacorp Artiste Management contract deal worth more than $100,000.

Following his win, he appeared most of Mediacorp shows such as Sinar Lebaran 2007 and 2008, Khayalan etc. He also appeared for a short 30  seconds KFC advertisement in 2007. It was reported by Malaysian magazine in 2008 he was juggling his busy schedule as an O levels student (private candidate) and career as a singer.

In 2009, Aliff Aziz was enlisted to the compulsory National Service where he was an instructor at the Singapore Civil Defence Force (Formerly known as BRTC/Basic Rescue Training Centre) in Jalan Bahar. In a Sungguh interview in 2010, Aliff was posted to admin to allow him to focus more on his singing career.

During that same year, Aliff released his second album "It's Aliff's Time" with its hits single "Cinta" and "Kalau Cinta" featuring Malaysian songstress Joanna. "Kalau Cinta" topped the radio charts for a few months making it another record breaking song.

Aliff Aziz was member of Singapore Civil Defence Force Music Performing Arts Club (MPAC), where he performed as a vocalist for many SCDF occasions such as SCDF Promotion Ceremony, SCDF Community Day etc.

In 2011, Aliff ended his service with the nation and moved over to Kuala Lumpur, Malaysia to pursue his career as a recording artist, singer, model and actor.

In early 2012, Aliff Aziz released his third album "Aliff Aziz" where his single "Jangan Ganggu Pacarku" received 1 million views on its music video within 24 hours of release. Aliff other songs such as Cinta Ya Cinta and Setiap Detik was used as OST for dramas too.

Aliff also started a career in acting, his first drama, a comedy cum musical based drama "Antara Kita" which was directed by Kas Roshan about teenagers working in a graphic design company. The 13 episode drama also stars Zaibo, Fara Fauzana, Bell Ngasri and Anne Ngasri.

In December 2021, Aliff joined Malaysia's singing competition, Gegar Vaganza in which he ended up winning it and crowned champion. He also received RM 100,000 as a reward for coming in the first place.

Personal life
In 2016, after dating almost two years and being engaged for nine months, Aliff and Malaysian singer and actress Bella Astillah took their marriage vows and held a wedding reception for about 1,000 guests at the Top Glove in Shah Alam, Selangor. They have a son.

Aliff Aziz and Bella were officially divorced in 2019 but reconciled in April 2020.

Discography

Studio albums

Sony Music BMG & Sony Music Entertainment

Singles

Filmography

Television series
Singapore

Malaysia

Telemovie

References

External links
Aliff Aziz on Instagram

1991 births
21st-century Singaporean male singers
Singaporean pop singers
Pop rock singers
Rhythm and blues singers
Soul singers
Living people
Singaporean people of Malay descent
Singaporean people of Arab descent
Singaporean Muslims
Singaporean emigrants to Malaysia